Fatumiala (or Sail Rock) is a small island in the Pacific Ocean, a part of the Shefa Province of Vanuatu.

Geography
Sail Rock is located north-west of the island of Tongoa, between the latter and Epi. The islet has an elevation of 15 m above the sea level.

Geology
Fatumiala and the other islands scattered around Tongoa (Laika, Tefala) were once part of a larger landmass, which constituted the emerged part of the Kuwae submarine volcano and which united Tongoa with Epi. The volcano's caldera exploded around 1452, creating small islands.

References

Islands of Vanuatu
Shefa Province
Uninhabited islands of Vanuatu